is a Japanese footballer who plays for AC Nagano Parceiro.

Club statistics
Updated to 23 February 2018.

References

External links

Profile at Kyoto Sanga FC

1992 births
Living people
Kansai University alumni
Association football people from Shizuoka Prefecture
Japanese footballers
J2 League players
J3 League players
Kyoto Sanga FC players
AC Nagano Parceiro players
Association football defenders